Junio is a given name. Notable people with the name include:

Brazilian footballers
Astolpho Junio Lopes (born 1983), goalkeeper
Felipe Junio Alves (born 1987), striker
Junio César Arcanjo (born 1983), attacking midfielder

Other
Junio Valerio Borghese (1906–1974), Italian naval commander and hard-line fascist politician
Gilmore Junio (born 1990), Canadian speedskater

See also
Veinte de Junio, town located 35 km from Buenos Aires, in La Matanza, Argentina